Balkan Photo Festival is an annual photography festival held in Sarajevo, Bosnia and Herzegovina. It is held in January of every year and is the legal successor of the now-defunct Festival of Bosnian Photography. The festival was established in 2010 by the Urban Foundation in cooperation with the Association of Professional Photographers of Bosnia and Herzegovina and the online photography journal fotografija.ba. The 2011 edition was the first to be internationalized. Balkan Photo Festival is the largest photography festival in the Balkans, receiving more than 5,000 submissions annually.

Format
The festival is composed of three main programs: competition, education and networking. The competition program is further composed of 11 categories out of which 11 eventual winners are chosen. The 11 categories are as follows: Nudity, Fashion, Cultural Heritage, Mobile Phone, Sports and Leisure, Portrait, Abstract, Nature and Landscapes, News and Politics, Press. Submissions for the competition program are accepted from the beginning of December with the final selection being made during the first week of January. The festival is opened on the last Monday of January with a large festival-long exhibition of all the photographs selected for the competition program. A panel made up of eminent international photographers judges the entries and decides on the winners. The winners receive the Balkan Photo Award in their category. The education program kicks off after the festival opening and is made up of lectures and workshops organized in numerous venues across the city. The networking program, which is of an informal nature, includes round table discussions, tours of the city called photo safaris, interactive café lectures and concerts. The 2017 edition established the Justice for Every Child program in cooperation with UNICEF.

The Balkan Photo Award winners 
Selected winners:

2010 

 Jury: Haris Pašović, Aida Begić, Elmir Jukić, Želimir Žilnik
 Photo of the year: Roda i mjesec by Andrija Vrdoljak
 Sarajevo category: Vječni plamen by Edin Gačan 
 Nature category: One Tree by Amir Kehić
 Urban category: Epic by Dejan Vladić
 Report category: Pad vlade by Dado Ruvić
 Best photo selected by f.ba: Vrijeme po mom satu by Dolores Juhas

2011 

 Jury: Bevis Fusha, Denis Curti, Branislav Brkić, Marc Prust, Mario Periša, Zijah Gafić
 Press category: Nasilje nad Romima by Midhat Poturović
 City category: Ljubav by Miljan Šućur 
 People category: Maršal by Kristijan Antolović
 Nature category: Šuma koja nestaje by Zvonimir Barišin
 Abstract/Creative category: Praha by Roberto Pavić
 Best photo selected by f.ba: Život ide dalje by Denis Švrakić

2012 

 Jury: Bevis Fusha, Branislav Brkić, Marc Prust, Mario Periša, Zijah Gafić 
 Press category: Rudari by Midhat Poturović
 City category: Lekina bara by Marko Stamatović 
 People category: Come Back by Goran Bisić
 Nature category: Dolazak proljeća by Denis Ruvić
 Abstract/Creative category: Twisted by Filip Gržinčić

2013 

 Jury: Regina Azenberger, Dražen Stojčić, Mladin Pikulić, Mario Romulić, Amer Kapetanović, Jan Vermer, Marko Risović
 Press category: JMBG protesti by Sulejman Omerbašić
 City category: Buđenje novog dana by Edin Džeko 
 People category: Pogled by Siniša Plavšić
 Nature category: Jesenjski vjetar by Dino Šimek
 Abstract/Creative category: Dubioza Kolektiv by Goran Lizdek

2014 

 Jury: Andrew Testa, Dženat Dreković, Igor Rill, Mario Periša, Nemanja Jovanović, Stipe Surać, Zoran Marinović
 Press category: Putin in Belgrade by Vlado Kos
 City category: Limitless by Aida Redžepagić 
 People category: Drvo Života by Denis Ruvić
 Nature category: Jesenjski vjetar by Dino Šimek
 Abstract/Creative category: Three Sisters by Giulio Zanni

2015 

 Jury: Paul Lowe, Amel Emrić, Stoyan Nenov, Ivana Tomanović, Jože Suhadolnik, Jetmir Idrizi, Yannis Kontos, Osman Orsal, Iva Prosoli, Petrut Calinescu, Duško Miljanić
 Press category: Putin in Belgrade by Vlado Kos
 City category: Limitless by Aida Redžepagić
 People category: Drvo Života by Denis Ruvić
 Nature category: Jesenjski vjetar by Dino Šimek
 Abstract/Creative category: Three Sisters by Giulio Zanni

2016 

 Jury: Myles Little, Ilvy Njiokiktjien, Srđan Živulović, Petar Jurica, Goran Lizdek, Daniel Mihailescu, Srđan Ilić, Boryana Katsarova, Majlinda Hoxha, Ljiljana Karadžić, Ana Farngovska, Ferhat Uludaglar – Zupcevic
 Grand Prix award: Selfie kultura by Jelena Janković
 Nudity category: Blue body by Đula Bezeg
 Fashion category: Fashion Fetish by Franjo Matković
 Mobile Phone category: Senke by Irfan Ličina 
 Nature category: Church in the fields of Sorško polje by Andrej Tarfila
 Portrait category: Vlăduț by Ioana Cîrling
 Sports category: Traditional Wrestling by MD Tanveer Hassan Rohan
 News and Politics category: Idomeni, border closed by Olmo Calvo
 Report category: Veterans by Sasha Maslov
 Abstract/Creative category: Frentic City by HanShun Zhou

2017 

 Jury: Bénédicte Kurzen, Jim Casper, Máximo Panés, Maral Deghati, Ana Frangovska, Damir Senčar, Marko Marinković, Imre Szabo, Burim Myftiu, Senad Šahmanović, Aleksandra Nina Knežević, Ahmed Burić, Miro Majcen
 Grand Prix award: Selfie kultura by Jelena Janković
 Nudity category: Blue body by Đula Bezeg
 Fashion category: Fashion Fetish by Franjo Matković
 Mobile Phone category: Senke by Irfan Ličina 
 Nature category: Church in the fields of Sorško polje by Andrej Tarfila
 Portrait category: Vlăduț by Ioana Cîrling
 Sports category: Traditional Wrestling by MD Tanveer Hassan Rohan
 News and Politics category: Idomeni, border closed by Olmo Calvo
 Report category: Veterans by Sasha Maslov
 Abstract/Creative category: Frentic City by HanShun Zhou

References

External links
 Official website

Recurring events established in 2010
January events
Tourist attractions in Sarajevo
Annual events in Bosnia and Herzegovina
Photography festivals
Festivals in Sarajevo